Major General George Erroll Prior-Palmer,  (20 February 1903 – 18 August 1977) was a senior British Army officer and businessman of Anglo-Irish origins. He saw service in the Second World War and later was military attaché at the British Embassy in Washington, D.C. and General Officer Commanding the 6th Armoured Division. In civilian life he entered the world of commercial shipping and was successively a director of the Union-Castle Line, manager of Cayzer Irvine, and managing director of Overseas Containers Limited, before retiring in 1969.

Early life
The son of Prior Spunner Prior-Palmer, of County Sligo and 32 Merrion Square, Dublin, and Anne Leslie Gason, of Kilteelagh, County Tipperary, Prior-Palmer was educated in England at Wellington College and at the Royal Military College, Sandhurst.

Military career
From Sandhurst, Prior-Palmer was in 1923 commissioned as a second lieutenant into the 9th Lancers, in which his elder brother Otho Prior-Palmer was already serving. He was promoted captain in 1930, lieutenant colonel in 1941, colonel in 1946, and brigadier in 1948. In 1940 he saw active service in North West Europe, where he was mentioned in despatches, and in 1944 took part in the Normandy landings as commander of the 27th Armoured Brigade, serving on the continent until 1945. In 1946 he went to Washington, D.C. as military attaché at the British Embassy, a two-year posting. In 1951 he was promoted major general and given command of the newly reformed 6th Armoured Division. In 1953 he returned to Washington D.C. as Commander, British Army Staff, and Military Member, British Joint Services Mission, this time remaining for three years. He was President of the Regular Commissions Board from 1956 to 1957 and retired from the service in 1958.

Prior-Palmer was awarded the Distinguished Service Order, French Legion of Honour and Belgian Croix de Guerre in 1945, and appointed a Companion of the Order of the Bath in 1952.

Business career
In 1958 Prior-Palmer joined the British & Commonwealth Shipping Company. From 1959 to 1964 he was the Southampton area director of the Union-Castle Line, manager of Cayzer Irvine and special adviser to the British and Commonwealth Group from 1964 to 1965, and from 1965 to 1969 managing director of Overseas Containers Ltd. He retired in 1969, but from 1973 until his death was a director of J. A. Peden Ltd.

Other appointments
President, Wessex Rehabilitation Association, 1962–1977
Patron, League of Venturers, 1972–1977

Private life
In 1935, Prior-Palmer married Katherine Edith, daughter of Frank Bibby, and with her had one daughter, Anne. In 1948, he married Lady Doreen Hersey Winifred Hope, the younger daughter of Victor Hope, 2nd Marquess of Linlithgow, and they had one son, Simon Erroll, and one daughter, Lucinda Jane.

Prior-Palmer was a member of the Cavalry and Guards Club and the Royal Ocean Racing Club and in retirement lived at Appleshaw House, Andover, Hampshire. He died on 18 August 1977.

References

External links
Generals of World War II

 

1903 births
1977 deaths
9th Queen's Royal Lancers officers
British Army generals
British Army brigadiers of World War II
Graduates of the Royal Military College, Sandhurst
Companions of the Distinguished Service Order
Companions of the Order of the Bath
People educated at Wellington College, Berkshire
Recipients of the Croix de guerre (Belgium)
British military attachés